The fourth series of British reality television series The Apprentice (UK) was broadcast in the UK on BBC One, from 26 March to 11 June 2008. Around over 20,000 applications were made by potential participants seeking to take part on the programme, with the fourth series being the only one to date to feature more than two finalists moving on beyond the Interviews stage. Alongside the standard twelve episodes, four specials were aired alongside the series – "The Worst Decisions Ever" on 3 April; "Motor Mouths" on 18 April; "The Final Five" on 2 June; and "Why I Fired Them" on 8 June.

Sixteen candidates took part in the fourth series, with Lee McQueen becoming the overall winner. Excluding the specials, the series averaged around 7.29 million viewers during its broadcast.

Series overview 
Applications were made available in late Spring/early Summer 2007, towards the end of the third series' broadcast. The number received by production staff reached a high of around 20,000, leading to auditions and interviews being conducted regionally across London, Glasgow, Manchester and Bristol during the first two weeks of July, in order to assess each potential participant and narrow down the final line-up for the fourth series. Once the sixteen candidates for this series were finalised, filming of episodes took place between September and October. Although no major changes were made to the programme's format, the fourth series saw the introduction of another of Alan Sugar's close business associates, Karren Brady, as a fourth member of the interviewing panel, prior to her eventual role after the following series.

For the first task, the men named their team Renaissance, while the women named their team Alpha. This series is notably significant for being the only one to date to feature more than two finalists after the Interviews stage, due to Sugar finding it difficult to determine which two to send through to the final, ultimately firing one candidate in the penultimate stage – although the seventh and eighth series also featured more than two finalists, the final task was the Interviews stage in both. The series also is significant for the creation of two records for teams that had the most wins and most losses respectively. Of those who took part, Lee McQueen would become the eventual winner of the series, going on to work initially for Sugar's company AMSHOLD, and then for AMSCREEN as development director, under the employment of Sugar's son Simon Sugar. He would eventually leave his employment in 2010, to found his own recruitment agency.

Candidates

Performance chart 

Key:
 The candidate won this series of The Apprentice.
 The candidate was the runner-up.
 The candidate won as project manager on his/her team, for this task.
 The candidate lost as project manager on his/her team, for this task.
 The candidate was on the winning team for this task / they passed the Interviews stage.
 The candidate was on the losing team for this task.
 The candidate was brought to the final boardroom for this task.
 The candidate was fired in this task.
 The candidate lost as project manager for this task and was fired.

Episodes

Ratings 
Official episode viewing figures are from BARB.

Specials

References

External links 

 

2008 British television seasons
04